A safe-cracker is a person capable of opening a safe without either the combination or the key. It may also refer to:

Safecracker, a 1997 video game
Safecracker: The Ultimate Puzzle Adventure, its 2006 spiritual successor
Safecracker (pinball), the Bally pinball game from 1996
"The Safe-Cracker", an episode of Life on Mars

See also
Henschel Hs 129, a German Luftwaffe Aircraft